Josef Goldschmidt (* unknown; † unknown) was a German footballer who played for FC Basel. He played mainly in the position as midfielder.

Between the years 1905 and 1914 Goldschmidt played a total of 77 games for Basel, scoring a total of 4 goals. 56 of these games were in the Swiss Serie A, two in the Anglo-Cup and 19 were friendly games. He scored one goal in the domestic league, the other three were scored during the test games.

In the 1912–13 season Basel won the Anglo-Cup. Goldschmidt was part of the team that won the final on 29 June 1913 in the Hardau Stadium, Zürich against FC Weissenbühl Bern 5–0.

Sources and References
 Rotblau: Jahrbuch Saison 2017/2018. Publisher: FC Basel Marketing AG. 

FC Basel players
German footballers
Association football midfielders